harvest was an Australian literary magazine based in Melbourne. Founded in 2007, the first issue appeared in June 2008. It stopped accepting submissions and publishing on its website after October 2011.

Content 
harvest published:
 fiction
 memoir
 essays
 creative non-fiction
 poetry
 art

Contributors 
harvest published new Australian writers, including Jessica Au, Emily Bitto, Iain Britton, Simon Cox, Patrick Cullen, Nathan Curnow, Maxine Clarke, Anthony Lawrence, Joel Magarey, Meg Mundell, Ruby Murray, Ryan O'Neill, Nick Powell, Josephine Rowe, Michael Sala, Estelle Tang, Tara June Winch and Evie Wyld. Featured Australian artists included Michelle Macintosh, Allison Colpoys, Luci Everett and the Greedy Hen team. Featured international artists included Martin O'Neill and Wallzo.

Staff
 Founding Editors Davina Bell, Julia Carlomagno and Rachael Howlett
 Poetry Editor Josephine Rowe
 Art Director Imogen Stubbs
 Design Template Marc Martin

From 2007 until mid-2009, harvest'''s poetry editor was Geoff Lemon.

References

External links
 harvest website
'Words Matter Here', Fiona Gruber, The Australian.
'As Ye Sow', David Astle, Cassowary Crossing.
Colophon International Magazine Symposium
Journal review literaryminded''

2007 establishments in Australia
2011 disestablishments in Australia
Defunct literary magazines published in Australia
Magazines established in 2007
Magazines disestablished in 2011
Magazines published in Melbourne